Ave Maria is a 1984 French drama film directed by Jacques Richard, who co-wrote screenplay with Paul Gégauff.

Plot
Fifteen-year-old Ursula awakens to sensuality with Paul, a teenager of her age. She lives in a small village, in a fairly closed environment, strongly steeped in religion.

The inhabitants of this village live under the domination of the defrocked priest Adolphe Éloi, whom everyone calls "the Holy Father". The latter and his companion Berthe Granjeux, "the Holy Mother", try to subdue the young girl who is truly the only one who does not accept their tyranny. They try to make her feel guilty, and it is out of revolt that the teenager imposes herself and opposes them with increasingly perverse tendencies.

On Christmas Eve, Adolphe Éloi’s "faithful" are on trial. During this night dedicated to exorcism, Ursula must undergo an avalanche of corporal punishment intended to cleanse her of all her sins.

Primary cast
 Anna Karina - Berthe Granjeux
 Féodor Atkine - Adolphe Eloi
 Isabelle Pasco - Ursula
 Pascale Ogier - Angélique
 Dora Doll - Constance
 Bernard Freyd - Mathieu

External links
 
 

French drama films
1984 films
Films with screenplays by Paul Gégauff
1980s French films